Knyasi is an administrative ward in the Kondoa district of the Dodoma Region of Tanzania. According to the 2012 census, the ward has a total population 8816  households.

References
 

Dodoma Region
Kondoa District